The 2019 South African Hip Hop Awards were held at The Lyric Theatre, Gold Reef City Casino in Johannesburg, Gauteng Province. This marked the ceremony's 8th anniversary.

The nominees were announced on 29 October 2019.

Nominations and winners 
The following is a list of nominees. The winners were initially announced on 20 November 2019 at the ceremony. 

Best Remix

Yanga Chief featuring Kwesta - Juju Remix (Yuri x KingP)

Zaddy Swag featuring DJ Capital, Touchline, Emtee, PdotO, AB Crazy, Red Button and Big Star Johnson - Warrior (Remix)

Shane Eagle - Ap3x (Remastered) featuring Bas

DJ D Double D featuring AKA, Da L.E.S and YoungstaCPT - Yeah (Remix)

25K featuring Emtee and AKA - Culture Vulture (Remix)

References

External links
 Official website

2019 music awards
2019 awards